The Sultanate of Buton was an indigenous sultanate in what is today Indonesia. It used to rule over Buton island and adjacent areas within present-day Southeast Sulawesi province. It was a constitutional monarchy with its own written constitution and law, complete with bodies acting as a legislature, a system of judiciary, and executive power.

Early history 
The islands that comprised the sultanate's territory were called Liwuto Pataanguna, meaning "Four Islands". People from the Buton Islands were called tukang besi, literally meaning "blacksmith". There are several versions of how people there were named this way, one from an oral story of a Dutch man who arrived on the islands and was surprised to find almost everyone using iron tools, hence he named it Toekang Besi Eilanden. Another version suggests that it was from another kingdom within the region named the kingdom of Tukabessi.

The Islands of Buton were mentioned in the Nagarakretagama and Palapa oath, suggesting that the islands were once under the influence of Majapahit. The kingdom was established around the 1300s by a queen named Wa Kaa Kaa. Before the kingdom converted to Islam, most of the rulers were female. The first king that converted to Islam was King Murhun, later renamed Sultan Murhum Kaimuddin Khalifatul Khamis after his conversion. The Kingdom of Buton officially converted to Islam under his reign with the help of a scholar from the Johor Sultanate.

Constitutional monarchy 
Unlike other kingdoms and sultanates in the region, the Sultanate of Buton was a constitutional monarchy. The constitution was written and named Murtabat Tujuh. This constitution was formalized by Sultan La Elangi (1597–1631) and did not change much until sultanate was abolished.

Legacy 
During the 16th century, the city of Baubau had heavy fortifications which today is the Buton Palace Fortress, a popular tourist attraction in the region.

References 

Precolonial states of Indonesia
Former countries in Indonesian history